Six ships of the Royal Navy have been named HMS Charybdis, after the sea monster Charybdis of Greek mythology.

 The first  was an 18-gun brig-sloop in use from 1809 to 1819. She apparently became the whaler Greenwich which made three complete voyages and then wrecked in the Seychelles in 1833 while on her fourth.
 The second  was a 10-gun brig-sloop in use from 1831 to 1843.
 The third  was a screw corvette launched in 1859, loaned to Canada from 1880 to 1882, and sold 1884.
 The fourth  was an  protected cruiser launched in 1893, converted to a cargo ship in 1918 and sold to Bermuda in 1922.
 The fifth  was a  launched in 1940 and sunk in the English Channel by German torpedo boats in 1943.  Twenty-one of the sailors' bodies were washed up on the shores of Guernsey, where they were given a burial with full military honours by the German occupying forces.  Every year a commemoration service is held, which is attended by local naval veterans, Sea Cadets and representatives of the Royal Navy.
 The sixth  was a  launched in 1968 and sunk as a target in 1993.

Royal Navy ship names